Hiromi Marissa Ozaki (born 1 July 1985), better known by her pseudonym Sputniko!, is a British/Japanese artist, designer and entrepreneur. She specializes in the field of speculative and critical design. She is known for her films and multimedia installation works inspired by emerging technologies’ possible impact on society and values – with a focus on gender issues.

Her high school friends in Japan gave her the nickname “Sputnik”, from the artificial Earth satellite launched by the Soviet Union, due to her interest in science and fair skin which her friends associated with Russia. She added “Ko” (子), a character commonly used at the end of Japanese girl names, to Sputnik after learning that it was the first-ever satellite creating her now iconic pseudonym.

After majoring in BSc Mathematics and Computer Science at Imperial College, London, she pursued a master's degree in Design Interactions at the Royal College of Art.
 
Her art and design works have been internationally exhibited in museums such as Cooper Hewitt Design Museum (USA), Museum of Modern Art (USA), Pompidou Centre-Metz (France), ZKM Art Center (Germany), Museum of Contemporary Art Tokyo (Japan), Mori Art Museum (Japan) and Victoria & Albert Museum (UK). Her works have also been shown in numerous art festivals including Triennale di Milano (Italy), Art & Science International Exhibition (Beijing) and Setouchi Art Trienniale (Japan).

Career

Art and Design 
Sputniko! creates possible future scenarios and future artifacts inspired by emerging or existing technologies to promote discourse on topics such as gender, reproduction and interspecies relations. She often works with scientists to develop working prototypes of future artifacts. To convey a possible future scenario, she creates iconic music videos consisting of explanatory and narrative lyrics, pop music and films which often stars herself. 
 
She also creates artworks with Masaya Kushino as the art duo Another Farm. Another Farm explores the relationship between humanity and nature by working with scientists and engineers to produce works that bring together new technology, traditional techniques and cultures.

As an artist and designer, she was named Vogue Japan's Women of the Year in 2013 and selected as one of Young Global Leaders in 2017 by World Economic Forum, and as one of twenty young researchers, artists and designers to become "TED Fellows in 2019.""

To date, she has had her works included in the permanent collections of museums such as the Victoria and Albert Museum (UK) and the 21st Century Museum of Contemporary Art, Kanazawa (Japan).

Education and Research 
From 2013 to 2017, Sputniko! was an assistant professor at the MIT Media Lab  where she founded and directed the Design Fiction research group. In October 2017, She was appointed as an Associate Professor of RCA-IIS Design Lab in the Institute of Industrial Engineering at the University of Tokyo which she continued until 2019. Currently, she is an associate professor of the Department of Design at Tokyo University of the Arts.

Entrepreneurship  
Spuniko! founded Cradle, a women’s healthcare service that supports the well-being of female employees working in Japanese corporations.

Awards 
ASIAGRAPH “Tsumugi Award”(2020)
Newsweek Japan "100 Japanese people respected by the world"(2018)
Pomellato for Women Award winner(2018)
The 11th "L’Oréal-UNESCO For Women Scientists in Japan Award"(2016)
DSA Japan Space Design Silver Award(2016) 
France Le Figaro magazine "30 talented women in the world under the age of 30"(2015)
FORBES JAPAN "10 Japanese women who create the future"(2014)
Digital Media Association 19th AMD Award Newcomer Award(2014)
Nikkei Business "The 100 Japan's Leading 100 People"(2014)
VOGUE JAPAN Woman of the Year 2013 Winner(2013) 
Ars Electronica Hybrid Art "Honorary Mention" Winner《Healing Fukushima Nanohana Heels》(2013)
Ars Electronica Interactive Art "Honorary Mention" Winner《Menstruation Machine – Takashi's Case》(2012)
US Advertising Age Magazine "The 50 Most Creative People of 2011"(2011)
Rolling Stone Italy magazine "20 designers who will most affect the next 10 years"(2011)
Singapore Art Museum [APBF Signature Art Prize] Nomination  《Menstruation Machine – Takashi's Case》(2011)
YouTube Japan Video Award [Technology / Ride Category] Winner 《Menstruation Machine – Takashi's Case》(2010)
The 14th Japan Media Agency Media Arts Festival [Jury's Recommended Works] Award 《Crowbot ☆ Jenny》(2010)
Ars Electronica "The Next Idea" Winner, shared with Cesar Harada《Open_sailing》(2009)

Exhibitions and Festivals  
2009
 Ars Electronica, Linz, Austria
2010
"Tokyo Art Meeting Transformation" - Museum of Contemporary Art (MOT), Tokyo
2011
"Tweet Me Love, Sputniko! (Solo Exhibition)" - Omotesando Gyre, Tokyo
"The 14th Japan Media Arts Festival" - The National Art Center, Tokyo
"Talk to Me" - Museum of Modern Art (MoMA), New York
2012
"Hyper Archipelago" - Omotesando Gyre, Tokyo
"Light of Silence" - Aomori Museum of Art, Japan
"Sputniko! Loves London" - Seibu Department Store, Tokyo
"Daikanyama Art Street" - Daikanyama Hillside Terrace, Tokyo
"The 3rd Art & Science International Exhibition" - China Science and Technology Museum, Beijing
"Anonymous Life" - NTT InterCommunication Center, Tokyo
"Otomachi Senju no En" - Art Access Adachi, Tokyo
2013
"Foo" - Kunsthall Grenland, Norway
"Takamatsu Contemporary Art Annual – Daydreams" - Takamatsu City Art Museum, Takamatsu, Japan
"Tokyo Art Meeting Bunny Smash" - Museum of Contemporary Art (MOT), Tokyo
2014
"Killer Heels" - Brooklyn Museum, New York
"The GREAT Small: Gender Design Exhibition" - Hong Kong Polytechnic University, Hong Kong
"The Future is Not What It Used To Be 2nd" - Istanbul Design Biennial, Istanbul
2015
"JUMP" - Towada Art Center, Aomori, Japan 
"In Our Time: Art in Post-industrial Japan" - 21st Century Museum of Contemporary Art, Kanazawa, Japan
"Tranceflora – Amy’s Glowing Silk (Solo Exhibition)" - Gucci Gallery Shinjuku, Tokyo
"Killer Heels" - The Albuquerque Museum, Albuquerque, NM, USA
"Anti-Adaptation Struggle (Solo Exhibition)" - Omotesando Gyre, Tokyo, Japan
2016
"GLOBALE: New Sensorium – Exiting from Failures of Modernization" - The ZKM Center for Art and Media, Karlsruhe, Germany

"Setouchi Art Triennial (Permanent Project)" - Teshima Island, Benesse Art site Naoshima, Japan
"Lunar Attraction Essex" - Peabody Museum
"Collecting Future Japan" - Victoria & Albert Museum, London
"Beijing Media Art Biennale" - Beijing Central Art Academy Museum of Art, China
"After Belonging Oslo" - Architecture Triennale, Norway
"The Universe and art " - Mori Art Museum, Tokyo
"Adriane's Thread" - MILL 6 Foundation, Hong Kong
2017
"The Universe and Art" - ArtScience Museum, Singapore
"MASCULINE ←→ FEMININE" - Beall Center Art + Technology, Irvine, California
"Japan: An Imaginary Guide" - Art Arsenal, Kiev, Ukraine
"VOYAGES" - H QUEEN’S, Hong Kong
"Sputniko! X Lamborghini" - TOKYO ART FAIR, Tokyo
"Yokohama Triennale: Island and Constellation and Galapagos" - Yokohama Museum of Art, Yokohama
"bionic by sputniko! | (Solo exhibition)" - SEIBU Gallery, Tokyo
"Perfect Bodies | Rebellious Machines " - Arte Alameda, Mexico City, Mexico
"Japanorama" - Pompidou Center Metz, Metz, France
"Future Unknown" - Beijing Central Academy of Fine Arts Museum, China
2018
"Gravité Zéro-Une exploration artistique de l'aventure spatiale" - les Abattoirs, Musee-FRAC Occitanie Toulouse, Toulouse, France
"Creatures Made to Measure" - Marta Herford Museum, Germany
2019
"Milan International Design Triennale:Broken Nature" - Milan, Italy
"Refiguring the Future" - 205 Hudson Gallery, New York
"Cube Design Triennale: Nature" -Kerkrade, Netherlands
"Cooper Hewitte Design Triennale: Nature" - Cooper Hewitte Museum, New York
"Japan Unlimited" - MuseumsQuartier Wien, Wien, Austria
"Out of Box" - Ars Electronica, Linz, Austria
"40 years Humanizing Technology" - Design Society, Shenzhen, China
"Future and The Arts" - Mori Art Museum, Tokyo
2020
"Broken Nature" - MoMA, New York
2021
"Festival El Aleph" - Rejas Milla Casa del Lago UNAM, México
"Fictional Life: Hybridity, Trangenetics, Innovation" - Taiwan Contemporary Culture Lab, Taiwan
"Microwave International New Media Arts Festival" - Hong Kong
"751 International Design Festival" - Beijing, China
"deTour 2021 Design Festival" - PMQ, Hong Kong

Works  
Red Silk of Fate - The Shrine (2021)
Boundaries (2019) *as “Another Farm”
Triaina (2019)  *as “Another Farm” 
Modified Paradise (2018)  *as “Another Farm”   
Tokyo Medical University for Rejected Women (2019)
bionic by Sputniko! (2017)
Red Silk of Fate - Tamaki's Crush (2016)
Tranceflora - Amy's Glowing Silk (2015)
The Moonwalk Machine - Selena's Step (2013)
Crowbot Jenny (2011)
Menstruation Machine – Takashi’s Take (2010)
Sushiborg Yukari (2010)

References

External links 
 

Living people
Japanese contemporary artists
1985 births
MIT Media Lab people
Japanese people of British descent
British people of Japanese descent
Alumni of the Royal College of Art